Appendicular can refer to:
 The vermiform appendix
 The appendicular artery, a branch of the ileocolic artery.
 The appendicular skeleton